Cathleen Moore-Linn (born 9 July 1961) is a Guamanian windsurfer. She competed in the women's mistral one design event at the 1996 Summer Olympics.

References

External links
 
 

1961 births
Living people
Guamanian windsurfers
Female windsurfers
Guamanian female sailors (sport)
Olympic sailors of Guam
Sailors at the 1996 Summer Olympics – Mistral One Design
Place of birth missing (living people)
21st-century American women